The Güglinger Bluegrass Festival was a yearly bluegrass music festival that took place in Güglingen, Germany. The festival became one of the largest bluegrass festivals in Europe until it ceased after 2001. It has been followed by the Internationales Bühler Bluegrass Festival.

The festival attracted major bands from the American scene like the Nashville Bluegrass Band, Country Gazette, The Tony Rice Unit, Laurie Lewis and Grant Street, and Tim O'Brien and the O'Boys.

See also
List of bluegrass music festivals 
List of European bluegrass festivals

References

Folk festivals in Germany
Bluegrass festivals

de:Güglinger Bluegrass Festival